In Western ecclesiastical architecture, a cathedral diagram is a floor plan showing the sections of walls and piers, giving an idea of the profiles of their columns and ribbing. Light double lines in perimeter walls indicate glazed windows. Dashed lines show the ribs of the vaulting overhead. By convention, ecclesiastical floorplans are shown map-fashion, with north to the top and the liturgical east end to the right.

Many abbey churches have floorplans that are comparable to cathedrals, though sometimes with more emphasis on the sanctuary and choir spaces that are reserved for the religious community. Smaller churches are similarly planned, with simplifications.

Design 
Cathedral floorplans are designed to provide for the liturgical rites of the church.  Before the legalization of Christianity by Emperor Constantine, Christians worshiped in private homes or in secretive locations. Once legally able to publicly worship, the local congregations adapted the available Roman designs to their needs.  Unlike the Roman and Greek religions, where priests performed rituals without public participation, Christian worship involved the believers.  Thus, the limited spaces typically used in pagan temples were not suitable to Christian worship.
Roman civic buildings were designed for the participation of the citizens of the city, and thus the Roman Basilica was adopted for Christian purposes.  This included an entry on one end of a long narrow, covered space with a raised dais at the other end.  Upon the dais, public officials would hear legal cases, or expound on some matter of public interest. Christians adopted the long hall of the basilica for the public liturgy of the Mass.

Glossary
 Aisle: A pair of walkways that are parallel to the primary public spaces in the church, e.g. nave, choir and transept. The aisles are separated from the public areas by pillars supporting the upper walls, called an arcade.
 Ambulatory: A specific name for the curved aisle around the choir
 Apse: The end of the building opposite the main entry.  Often circular, but it can be angular or flat. In medieval traditions, it was the east end of the building.  
 Buttress:  Large stone pier holding the roof vaults in place. A buttress may be visible as in the Gothic flying buttress, or it may be hidden in the complex of aisles and galleries.
 Cathedral: The home church of a bishop, which contains the cathedra or bishop's chair.  The church may be of any size.  
 Choir (or Quire): The part of the church usually beyond the transept and in line with the axis of the nave.  The area may be higher than the level of the nave.  The name choir is used because traditionally the clergy of the Cathedral stood here as a chorus, chanting or singing during the responsive portion of Divine Offices or Mass. 
 Crypt: Usually the below ground foundation.  Used for burial or as a chapel.  
 Facade: The outside of the church, where the main doors are located.  In traditional medieval design, this faced the west and is called the West End.
 Narthex: The entrance or lobby area, located at the west end of the nave.
 Nave: The primary area of public observance of the Mass.  It is generally the largest space, and located between the narthex and sanctuary.
 Radiating Chapels: Located around the Apse of the church, accessible from the Ambulatory.
 Sanctuary: An elevated platform that contains the main altar and associated liturgical elements that is restricted for ceremonial use by the clergy, often fenced from adjoining spaces. It is centered on the main east–west axis within the east end and generally located within the choir or the apse.   
 Transept: Sometimes called the ‘Crossing’, the transept forms wings at right angles to the nave.  In early Romanesque churches, it was often at the east end, creating a Tau Cross.  Later designs placed the transept about two-thirds of the way from the West End to the East End. This created the Latin cross plan.

See also
 Architecture of cathedrals and great churches
 Church architecture, including description of common terms
  List of largest church buildings

References

External links 

Salisbury Cathedral floor plan
Canterbury Cathedral: several floor plans
Plan of Canterbury Cathedral
Durham Cathedral Layout
The Plans of Saint-Sernin, Toulouse and Amiens Cathedral
St. Patrick's Cathedral Floorplan (Armagh)
Exeter Cathedral Floorplan 

Church architecture
Diagrams